Ko of Wa (興) was a historical figure in Japan during the 5th century. According to the Chinese historical book "Wajinden," he was one of the five kings of Wa (an ancient name for Japan) and became the crown prince after the death of his father, King Sai. He was sent as a tributary to the Southern Dynasty of China in 462, during the reign of Emperor Taiwu of the Northern Wei, and was appointed as the General of the East and given the title of king of Wa. Some theories suggest that he is comparable to the Emperor Ankō in the "Nihon Shoki" (Chronicles of Japan).

Son of Sai and brother of Bu, one of the Kings of Wa. Some have compared him to the 20th Emperor Ankō, others to Prince Ichibe Oshiwa, or Kinashi no Karu.

Sources

References

See also 

 Five kings of Wa
 Emperor Ankō

External links 

 漢籍電子文献資料庫 - 台湾中央研究院

Five kings of Wa
Pages with unreviewed translations